Maurizio Iorio (born 6 June 1959 in Milan) is an Italian former professional footballer who played as a striker. He played for several Italian clubs throughout his career, and during the 1982–83 season, he won the Serie A title with Roma, forming a formidable offensive partnership with the more offensive-minded Roberto Pruzzo. At international level, he represented the Italy national football team at the 1984 Summer Olympics.

Style of play
Considered to be a highly talented player in his youth, Iorio was a diminutive forward, who was highly regarded for his speed, creativity, dribbling skills, and technical ability, which enabled him to get past more physically imposing players. However, he was also known to be inconsistent, due to his poor work-rate and undisciplined lifestyle off the pitch. He often played as a deep-lying forward behind a main centre-forward, due to his ability to provide assists, although he was also known for his eye for goal, and had a tendency to score decisive goals for his teams.

Honours
Roma
 Serie A: 1982–83

Inter
 UEFA Cup: 1990–91

References

1959 births
Living people
Italian footballers
Association football forwards
Serie A players
Serie B players
Serie C players
Olympic footballers of Italy
Footballers at the 1984 Summer Olympics
Calcio Foggia 1920 players
Torino F.C. players
Ascoli Calcio 1898 F.C. players
S.S.C. Bari players
A.S. Roma players
Hellas Verona F.C. players
ACF Fiorentina players
Brescia Calcio players
Piacenza Calcio 1919 players
Inter Milan players
Genoa C.F.C. players
UEFA Cup winning players
Vigevano Calcio players